Ipswich High School is a co-educational private school at Woolverstone Hall near Ipswich, England. Formerly an exclusive school for girls, it was converted to co-education in 2018 following acquisition by the China-oriented investment banker London & Oxford Group.

History
Ipswich High School was opened as a school for girls in the Assembly Rooms in Northgate Street, Ipswich, on 30 April 1878 with 43 pupils. The first headmistress, Miss Sophie Youngman, held the position for 21 years and the school flourished and expanded under her leadership. She was succeeded by Miss Kennett and, in 1905, the Council of the Trust purchased a large private house and grounds in Westerfield Road, Ipswich. The move provided a more modern classroom standard, science laboratories and a playing field.

Another house, Woodview House, was purchased in 1913.

Transition to the co-educational was commenced in 2018, with induction of the first boys scheduled for the new school year beginning in September. The change from a single-sex to co-educational system received mixed responses from parents and alumnae.  the school serves a wide area of Suffolk and north Essex, taking girls and boys aged 3–18 years and providing both primary, secondary school and sixth form education, where pupils take traditional A Levels in subjects such as Latin, History and Mathematics.

Governance
Following acquisition of the school by London and Oxford Group (LOG) in 2017, the principal and the chair of governors remained in their positions, reporting to the ownership subsidiary Ipswich Education Limited (IEL). Members of the Senior Leadership Team are identified on the school's official website.

On 11 March 2022 Mr Mark Howe resigned from his position as head. Mr Ian Davies was appointed interim Head from September to December 2022. Mr Dan Browning started as Head in Jan 2023. .

Facilities
Facilities include an AstroTurf playing field, indoor swimming pool, large theatre and sports hall. Extensive formal gardens remain from the historic estate. The grounds extend to the River Orwell, which is viewable from classrooms. In addition to the heritage Hall, there are buildings for the Senior Department and Junior Department. Students dine in the Orangery, situated in the main building, which also houses two libraries and the Sixth Form Centre. The Art Department is located adjacent to the stables and Prep School.

Curricula 
The school offers numerous subjects before GCSE, which include five different languages; along with ICT, the humanities, the arts, and the sciences. English, Mathematics, Biology, Chemistry and Physics (as Combined Science) must be taken at GCSE. At GCSE, pupils can study three optional subjects (excluding English Literature, English Language, Maths and Combined Science). At A Level, pupils can study three or four subjects with an 'enrichment course' (Astronomy, Cooking, Sports Leaders or Critical Thinking), with the option of taking an EPQ at A2. Pupils can study English Literature, Maths, Further Maths, Biology, Chemistry, Physics, Psychology, Physical Education, Three-Dimensional Design, Fine Art, Economics, Music, Philosophy, Geography, Dance, Drama & Theatre Studies, Religion, Philosophy & Ethics, History, Latin, French, German, Spanish, Computer Science, Classical Civilization, Economics and Business Studies at A Level.

To receive entry into the Senior School, the pupils must take three exams similar to the 11+ and then must maintain their academic expectations throughout the school, especially at GCSE level. Sixth Form students are admitted on the basis of their GCSE results. Academic support is available for pupils and tutors work closely to monitor their achievements. 

The school was ranked 19th in the ‘East Anglia independent schools’ category in the 2022 `Sunday Times parent power rankings.

Notable former pupils

June Brown, actress
Enid Blyton, author
Jade Holland Cooper, fashion designer
Frances Hardinge, author
Tracey MacLeod, journalist
Helen Oxenbury, illustrator

See also
 Independent Schools Council

References

External links
 Official website 
 Ipswich High School at Independent Schools Council website

Private schools in Suffolk
Educational institutions established in 1878
1878 establishments in England

Diamond schools
Woolverstone